Victoria Louise Samantha Marie Elizabeth Therese Eggar (born 5 March 1939) is a retired British-American actress. After beginning her career in Shakespearean theatre she rose to fame for her performance in William Wyler's thriller The Collector (1965), which earned her a Golden Globe Award, a Cannes Film Festival Award and an Academy Award nomination for Best Actress.

She later appeared as Emma Fairfax in Doctor Dolittle (1967) and the American drama The Molly Maguires (1970). In the early 1970s Eggar moved to the United States and Canada, where she later starred in several horror films, including The Dead Are Alive (1972), The Uncanny (1977) and David Cronenberg's cult thriller The Brood (1979).

Eggar has also worked as a voice actress, as Hera in Walt Disney's Hercules (1997) and in several video games, including Gabriel Knight 3: Blood of the Sacred, Blood of the Damned and 007: Nightfire. Her television work includes roles on Fantasy Island and a recurring part as Charlotte Devane in the soap opera All My Children in 2000.

Early life
Samantha Eggar was born Victoria Louise Samantha Marie Elizabeth Therese Eggar on 5 March 1939 in Hampstead, London, to Ralph Alfred James Eggar (a brigadier in the British Army) and Muriel Olga Palache-Bouma, who was of Dutch and Portuguese descent. The initials of the two triplets of given names form the initials of each of her parents' first lovers.  Soon after her birth, her family moved to rural Bledlow, Buckinghamshire, during World War II, where she spent her childhood.

Eggar was brought up as a Roman Catholic and educated at St Mary's Providence Convent in Woking, Surrey. Reflecting on her time at convent school, Eggar said: "The nuns didn't have too much success with me – I've always had a violent temper. In fact, once I almost killed one of the nuns." At age 16 she began to go by the name Samantha. Although Eggar expressed interest in acting at a young age, she was urged against a career in the theatre by her parents. She was offered a scholarship to the Royal Academy of Dramatic Arts but instead studied fashion for two years at the Thanet School of Art. After completing her studies she enrolled at the Webber Douglas Academy of Dramatic Art in London.

Career

Theatre and early work
Eggar began her acting career in several Shakespearean companies, notably playing Titania in a 1962 production of A Midsummer Night's Dream directed by Tony Richardson. She also appeared on stage in a production of Douglas Seale's Landscape with Figures, where she was noticed by a talent scout, and from there was cast in the biographical film Dr. Crippen (1962) opposite Donald Pleasence. Her second film role was in 1962 in The Wild and the Willing; in the same year she appeared on stage again as Olivia in a production of Twelfth Night by George Devine.

In 1965 Eggar appeared in the thriller The Collector, directed by William Wyler, playing a kidnap victim. She received a nomination for the Academy Award for Best Actress and won a Golden Globe award for her performance. She was also awarded Best Actress at the Cannes Film Festival in 1966. On her role as Miranda in The Collector Eggar has said: "My biggest relationship on set was with William Wyler. The tension on set was real. And if the tension wasn't there – if I didn't exude precisely what he wanted – well, Willi just poured cold water over me."

The following year Eggar starred in the comedy Walk, Don't Run (1966) with Cary Grant (his last motion picture) and Jim Hutton, followed by a lead role as Emma Fairfax in Richard Fleischer's musical adaptation of Doctor Dolittle (1967). In 1963 she played the lead role of Claire Avery in 'Marcia', a second-season episode of The Saint. After her appearance in The Saint Eggar did not appear on television for 10 years, instead focusing exclusively on feature films. These included The Molly Maguires (1970), in which she starred with Sean Connery, The Walking Stick, opposite David Hemmings, and The Light at the Edge of the World (1971), in which she starred with Kirk Douglas. Although she co-starred with Yul Brynner in the television series Anna and the King (1972) she did not make another television guest appearance until 1973, when she starred in the episode 'The Cardboard House' of the romantic anthology series Love Story. That same year she played Phyllis Dietrichson in a TV remake of the 1944 film Double Indemnity.

Move to United States
In 1973 Eggar moved to the United States, settling in Los Angeles, and appeared first in television, guest-starring in episodes of Starsky & Hutch and Columbo, the latter with Peter Falk and Theodore Bikel in the episode 'The Bye-Bye Sky High IQ Murder Case'. She would go on to star in a number of horror films, including The Lady in the Car with Glasses and a Gun (1970), The Dead Are Alive (1972), A Name for Evil (1973), The Uncanny (1977), David Cronenberg's cult sci-fi film The Brood (1979), and Demonoid Messenger of Death (1981). In 1980 she filmed the Canadian slasher film Curtains, released in 1983.

She also appeared as Maggie Gioberti in 'The Vintage Years', the pilot for the drama Falcon Crest, but was replaced by Susan Sullivan when the series went into production. She appeared twice on The Love Boat, first charming ship's captain, Merrill Stubing (played by Gavin McLeod), as fortune-teller Mary-Louise Murphy in 2 March 1979's 'A Funny Valentine'. Her second sailing, in 'Touchdown Twins', which was aired on 14 February 1981, was as Meg Chase, the mother of Billy (played by Philip Brown (actor)) whose friend Frank (played by Vincent Van Patten) develops a crush on Eggar's character. She appeared in the drama Dark Horse (1992), followed by the superhero film The Phantom (1996). In 1997 she provided the voice of Hera in Disney's animated film Hercules; she would also supply the voice for the subsequent television series. Eggar also had a role in the sci-fi thriller The Astronaut's Wife (1999), which starred Johnny Depp.

She has appeared as the wife of Captain Jean-Luc Picard's brother Robert on the television series Star Trek: The Next Generation, and as Sarah Templeton, the wife of Speaker of the House Nathan Templeton (Donald Sutherland), on the short-lived television series Commander in Chief, which starred Geena Davis. In the year 2000, she had a brief run as Charlotte Devane in the American soap opera All My Children. In 2003, she appeared in the first season of Cold Case, episode 14 ("The Boy in the Box") as Sister Vivian. In 2009, she played the mother of Jack and Becky Gallagher in season 1, episode 11 ("Lines in the Sand") of the Fox television series Mental.

Personal life
In 1964 she married actor Tom Stern and the couple have two children: film producer Nicolas Stern (b. 1965), and actress Jenna Stern (b. 1967). Eggar and Stern divorced in 1971.

Eggar holds dual UK and American citizenship. She is retired and resides in Los Angeles.

Filmography

Film

Television

Stage credits

Awards and nominations

References

Notes

Sources

External links

 
 
 Official website

1939 births
20th-century English actresses
21st-century English actresses
Actresses from London
Best Drama Actress Golden Globe (film) winners 
Cannes Film Festival Award for Best Actress winners
British expatriate actresses in the United States
English Shakespearean actresses
English expatriates in the United States
English film actresses
English people of Dutch descent
English people of Irish descent
English people of Portuguese descent
English Roman Catholics
English soap opera actresses
English stage actresses
English television actresses
English voice actresses
Alumni of the Webber Douglas Academy of Dramatic Art
Living people
People from Hampstead